North West Telecom is part of Rostelecom, providing telecommunications service to northwest Russia.

North-West Telecom became part of Rostelecom on April 1, 2011, together with the seven other Svyazinvest regional telecommunications operators and OJSC Dagsvyazinform.

Operations
The company operates the following branches:

Arkhangelsk branch, Arkhangelsk
Kaliningrad branch, Kaliningrad
Karelia branch, Petrozavodsk
Komi branch, Syktyvkar
Leningrad region branch, St. Petersburg
Murmansk branch, Murmansk
Novgorod branch, Veliky Novgorod
Pskov branch, Pskov
St-Petersburg branch, St. Petersburg
Vologda branch, Vologda

Note: there are separate branches for St-Petersburg and for the Leningrad Area.

External links
North West Telecom – Russian language and English language
Svyazinvest – Russian language and English language
Rostelecom – English language and Russian language

Cable television companies of Russia
Svyazinvest
Companies based in Saint Petersburg
Companies formerly listed on the Moscow Exchange
Defunct companies of Russia